Mandian may refer to:

 Mandian, Pakistan
 Mandian, a village in Anhui, China
 Mandaeism